James Alfred Bradshaw (born January 13, 1939) is a former professional American football safety for five seasons for the Pittsburgh Steelers in the National Football League (NFL). He graduated in 1958 from St. Clairsville High School and in 1963 from University of Chattanooga (which later became University of Tennessee at Chattanooga).

References

1939 births
Living people
People from St. Clairsville, Ohio
Sportspeople from Wheeling, West Virginia
American football defensive backs
Chattanooga Mocs football players
Pittsburgh Steelers players